Dania Nicole Pérez Jiménez (born 30 August 2001) is a Mexican professional football midfielder who currently plays for Monterrey of the Liga MX Femenil.

Career
A native of Guadalajara, Pérez trained for gymnastics in her home town as a child. She began playing youth football at her school in Guadalajara, Mexico, and had a spell with RCD Espanyol Femenino youth team in 2017.

Pérez returned to Mexico where she played for Chivas Femenil in Liga MX Femenil, scoring 3 goals in 10 matches during the 2018–19 Apertura tournament. She followed that with five goals in 15 matches during the Clausura tournament. In October 2019, made her 50th Liga MX Femenil appearance for Chivas.

In December 2020, Pérez joined Monterrey.

International career

Mexico U-17 women's national football team 

On June 12, 2018, Mexico U-17 women's national football team finished as Runners-up at the 2018 CONCACAF Women's U-17 Championship.

On December 1, 2018, Mexico U-17 women's national football team finished as Runners-up at the 2018 FIFA U-17 Women's World Cup.
Pérez won the Silver Ball as the tournament's second-best player of the competicion.

Mexico U-20 women's national football team 

On March 8, 2020, Mexico U-20 women's national football team finished as Runners-up at the 2020 CONCACAF Women's U-20 Championship.

Honours

Mexico U-17 women's national football team
 CONCACAF Women's U-17 Championship: Runners-up: 2018
 FIFA U-17 Women's World Cup: Runners-up: 2018

Mexico U-20 women's national football team
 CONCACAF Women's U-20 Championship: Runners-up: 2020

Personal
Nike, Inc. selected Pérez to be part of its Dream Crazier advertising campaign in 2019.

References

External links 
 

2001 births
Living people
Footballers from Guadalajara, Jalisco
Mexican women's footballers
Women's association football midfielders
C.D. Guadalajara (women) footballers
Liga MX Femenil players
Mexico women's international footballers
Mexican children
Mexican footballers